Murder in the Library or Playthings of Desire (U.S. alternate title) is a 1933 American drama film directed by George Melford and starring Linda Watkins, James Kirkwood, Sr., and Reed Howes. It was made by the Poverty Row company Pinnacle Productions. It is a remake of the 1924 silent film Playthings of Desire.

Partial cast
 Linda Watkins as Gloria Dawn  
 James Kirkwood, Sr. as Jim Malvern  
 Reed Howes as Jack Halliday  
 Josephine Dunn as Anne Cabot Ford  
 Molly O'Day as Renee Grant  
 Jack Chapin as Wheeler Johnson

DVD release
The 1933 film was released on Region 0 DVD-R by Alpha Video on July 7, 2015.

References

Bibliography
 Liebman, Roy. The Wampas Baby Stars: A Biographical Dictionary, 1922-1934. McFarland, 2000.

External links

1933 films
American drama films
1933 drama films
1930s English-language films
Films directed by George Melford
American black-and-white films
1930s American films